John Marvin may refer to:
John Marvin (sailor) (1927–1980), American sailor
John Marvin (politician) (1678–1776), member of the House of Representatives of the Colony of Connecticut
John Marvin (boxer), English-Filipino boxer
John Gage Marvin (1815–1855), American lawyer

Johnny Marvin (1897–1944), musician

See also

John Marvyn (died 1566), MP